Bela powisiana is a species of sea snail, a marine gastropod mollusk in the family Mangeliidae.

Description
The length of tall, narrow shell attains 15 mm. It contains eight or nine whorls. The shell shows broad, orthocline ribs with a thickened rim at the sutures and crossed by fine, spiral striae. The aperture is narrow. The outer lip is not noticeably angular. The color of the shell varies from deep brown to purple with a broad brown band, interrupted over the ribs.

Distribution 
This species occurs in the Alboran Sea; in the Atlantic Ocean from Norway to the Bay of Biscay.

References

 Dautzenberg Ph. 1887 Une excursion malacologique à Saint-Lunaire (Ille-et-Vilaine) et aux environs de cette localité. Bulletin de la Société d’Etudes Scientifiques de Paris 9(2): 27 pp. 
 Nordsieck F 1977 The Turridae of the European seas. La Conchiglia, Roma. 131 pp. 
 Hayward, P.J.; Ryland, J.S. (Ed.) (1990). The marine fauna of the British Isles and North-West Europe: 1. Introduction and protozoans to arthropods. Clarendon Press: Oxford, UK. . 627 pp
 Martin Perez & Vera-Pelaez. 2006. Pliocenica, 5 : 55-60
 Martin Perez & Vera-Pelaez  2007 Bela mingoranceae (Mangeliinae Fischer, 1883, Conoidea), nueva especie actual de Estepona (Málaga, sur de España). Pliocenica 5: 1–6.
 Urra J. & Gofas S. (2009) New records of Bela powisiana (Dautzenberg, 1887) (Gastropoda: Conidae) in southern Europe. Journal of Conchology 40(1): 1-4

External links
 MNHN, Paris : Bela powisiana

powisiana
Gastropods described in 1887